Bero is a given name and a surname which may refer to:

 Bero (Bishop of Lausanne), Bishop of Lausanne from 932 to 947
 Bero (Bishop of Finland), mid 13th century
 Bero Beyer, Dutch film producer
 Johnny Bero (1922–1985), American Major League Baseball player
 Lisa Bero (born 1958), American academic
 Matúš Bero (born 1995), Slovak footballer
 Robert Bero (1941–2007), American artist and print maker